Ryan Scott Graham (born January 30, 1990, in Westland, Michigan) is the bassist/backing vocalist of New York pop-punk band State Champs. Ryan also has an acoustic solo project titled Speak Low If You Speak Love. Ryan is the former guitarist of Good Luck Varsity.

Discography

The Dry Leaf Project 
 "The Rap Song" (2007)
 For the Faithless and Forgiven (2008)
 Well Done, Good And Faithful Servant (2009)

Stab You in the Face 
 "May Day" (2008)

Good Luck Varsity 
 Liars & Thieves EP (2011)
 Thrones EP (2012)
 MTNS EP (2012)
 Foundations: 2007-2013 (2013)
 Curtains (2015)

Speak Low If You Speak Love 
 Sad to Say EP (2011)
 NB/SLIYSL - Split (with Northbound) (2013)
 Everything But What You Need  (2013, re-released 2015 on Pure Noise Records)
 Nearsighted (2018)

State Champs 
 Around The World and Back (2015)
 Around The World and Back Deluxe (2017)
 Living Proof (2018)
 Unplugged (2020)
 Kings Of The New Age (2022)

Pile of Love 
 Pile of Love (2021)

References 

1990 births
Living people